The 1984 Cheltenham Council election took place on 3 May 1984 to elect members of Cheltenham Borough Council in Gloucestershire, England. One third of the council was up for election. The SDP–Liberal Alliance became the largest party, but the council stayed in no overall control.

After the election, the composition of the council was
SDP–Liberal Alliance 14
Conservative 12
Residents Associations 4
Labour 2
Independent Conservative 1

Election result

Ward results

References

Cheltenham
Cheltenham Borough Council elections
1980s in Gloucestershire